Najibah Eradah (born 20 May 1983), also known as Brunei’s Polar Girl, is a teacher and environmentalist, who is the first Bruneian to have reached the South Pole.

South Pole expedition

Era and seven other woman, each from a different Commonwealth country, were selected from among over 800 candidates to take part in the Kaspersky Commonwealth Antarctic Expedition, which reached the South Pole on 29 December 2009. Explaining her participation in the expedition, she said: "I am passionate about environmental issues and hope to use my involvement in the expedition to raise awareness in Brunei of global warming and climate change".

Bruneian media described her achievement as "a historic day for Brunei and a momentous day for the Sultanate's women". Saiful Ibrahim, Vice president of the Brunei Adventure Recreation Association, described her as "an icon for all Bruneians, especially for women and our youths". She has become known in Brunei as "the Polar Girl". Bruneian businesswoman Halina Taib stepped in to fund the trip, after there were financial difficulties.

Personal life

Formerly a mathematics teacher in secondary school, Era became a government officer at the Bruneian Ministry of Foreign Affairs and Trade. She is married to Mohd Faierony Hazelin Haji Mat Jair.

See also
Antarctic ice sheet

References

1983 births
Bruneian explorers
Bruneian women
Living people
Female polar explorers